Majori Station is a railway station on the Torņakalns – Tukums II Railway in the Majori neighbourhood of Jūrmala, Latvia.

In 2015, the station underwent renovations that removed the central boarding platform and added two contemporary side platforms.

References

External links 

Railway stations in Latvia
Railway stations in the Russian Empire opened in 1877